Girl of the Ozarks is a 1936 American drama film directed by William Shea and written by Stuart Anthony, Maurine Babb, John Bright, Michael L. Simmons and Robert Tasker. The film stars Virginia Weidler, Henrietta Crosman, Leif Erickson, Elizabeth Russell, Russell Simpson, and Janet Young. The film was released on June 12, 1936, by Paramount Pictures.

Plot

Cast

References

External links 
 

1936 films
Paramount Pictures films
American drama films
1936 drama films
American black-and-white films
1930s English-language films
1930s American films